Stuart Chambers (born  14 September 1937 in Auckland) is a New Zealand ornithologist. He has been associated with ornithologists Charles Fleming, A. H. Hooper, Ross McKenzie and R.B. Sibson. He is the author of "Birds Of New Zealand - Locality Guide" and "New Zealand Birds – An Identification Guide". He has been involved with the Miranda Naturalists' Trust as well as the development of the Pūkorokoro Miranda Shorebird Centre, the Aroha Island Ecological Centre, and is a proponent of the development of birdwatching in New Zealand.  Chambers is also the owner and manager of the small, New Zealand based, publishing company, Arun Books.

References

https://www.amazon.com/STORY-MIRANDA-NATURALISTS-TRUST-1973-2000-ebook/dp/B005LRXXM4
chrome-extension://efaidnbmnnnibpcajpcglclefindmkaj/https://shorebirds.org.nz/wp-content/uploads/2017/09/PM-News-100.pdf

External links
 Arun Books

1937 births
Living people
New Zealand ornithologists